Alfred Unser (May 29, 1939 – December 9, 2021) was an American automobile racing driver, the younger brother of fellow racing drivers Jerry and Bobby Unser, and father of Al Unser Jr. He was the second of four men (A. J. Foyt, himself, Rick Mears and Hélio Castroneves) to have won the Indianapolis 500 four times (1970, 1971, 1978, 1987), the fourth of five to have won the race in consecutive years, and won the National Championship in 1970, 1983, and 1985. The Unser family has won the Indy 500 a record nine times. He was the only person to have both a sibling (Bobby) and child (Al Jr.) as fellow Indy 500 winners. Al's nephews Johnny and Robby Unser have also competed in that race. In 1971, he became the only driver to date to win the race on his birthday (his 32nd).

After his son Al Unser Jr. joined the national championship circuit in 1983, Unser was generally known by the retronyms "Al Unser Sr." or "Big Al."

Personal life

Unser was born in Albuquerque, New Mexico, the youngest of four sons of Mary Catherine (Craven) and Jerome Henry "Jerry" Unser. His father and two uncles, Louis and Joe, were also drivers. Beginning in 1926 they competed in the Pikes Peak International Hill Climb, an annual road race held in Colorado. Joe Unser became the first member of the Unser family to lose his life to the sport, killed while test-driving an FWD Coleman Special on the Denver highway in 1929.

Al's oldest brother Jerry became the first Unser to drive at the Indianapolis Motor Speedway, qualifying 23rd and finishing 31st in the 1958 Indianapolis 500. However, tragedy struck the next year when he was killed by injuries sustained in a fiery crash during a practice session.

Middle brother Bobby drove in his first Indianapolis 500 in 1963, and in 1968, became the first member of the family to win. Son Al Unser Jr. drove in his first in 1983.

Unser married Wanda Jesperson in 1958 and they had three children- Alfred Jr., Mary, and Deborah. Deborah died in a dune buggy accident in 1982.  Al and Wanda divorced in 1971 and Al married Karen Sue Barnes on November 22, 1977. Karen and Al divorced in 1988.

Al Unser, with his family, owned and operated the Unser Racing Museum in Albuquerque, New Mexico.

Racing career and Indianapolis 500

USAC and Indycar

He began racing in 1957, at age 18, initially competing primarily in modified roadsters, sprint cars and midgets. In 1965 he raced in the Indianapolis 500 for the first time and finished ninth. His breakout year in IndyCar's was in 1970 when he joined Vel's Parnelli Jones Racing, where he would drive for the next seven years.

He won the Indy 500 in 1970, two years after his brother, Bobby. During the race, he led for all but ten of the 200 laps and averaged . His quick pit stops were a factor in the victory, as well as the fact that VPJ had an insurmountable advantage over the field that year. That season, he won a record ten times on oval, road and dirt tracks to capture the United States Auto Club national championship. Unser competed in USAC's Stock Car division in 1967, and was the series Rookie of the Year.

Unser's bid to become the first three-time consecutive Indy 500 champion was thwarted when he finished second to Mark Donohue in the 1972 Indianapolis 500. Unser would continue driving for the team up until 1977. During a few of those years, VPJ lost their competitive edge after changing their chassis, as well as their failed F1 bid. By 1977, the team regained competitive form, although Unser would announce his departure for Jim Hall Racing at year's end. Unser would later say, in a 2020 interview, that his departure from VPJ stemmed from disagreements with Jones and his partners over the direction of the team, although Unser maintained a friendship with Jones.

Despite starting the 1978 Indianapolis 500 from the fifth position in a First National City Travelers Checks Chaparral Lola, Unser's car was considered before the race to be a second-tier entry at best, if not an outright long shot to win. Moving to the front of the field for the first time on lap 75, he and opponent Danny Ongais engaged in an on-again off-again duel for 75 more laps, before an engine failure on Ongais' car on lap 150 allowed Unser to assume a commanding 35 second lead. Although suffering right front-wing misalignment due to impacting a tire on his final pit stop, a situation that led to the lead shrinking steadily over the race's final 20 laps, it nevertheless proved wide enough for victory by nine seconds to spare at the checkered flag.  Unser's race average speed of  ranked as the then-second fastest ever run (one mile per hour less than the then-1972 record), and would not itself be topped for second for four more years.

In 1979, Unser departed Jim Hall's team for the Longhorn Racing Team owned by Bobby Hillin Sr.. Although Unser went winless for three seasons, he would later say that driving for the Hillin family was his most joyful experience as a driver before his successful Penske years. The team folded operations after three years, putting Unser out of a ride.

In the 1983 season, Unser joined Team Penske and drove for four years in a Penske-owned car. Unser controlled the late stages of the 1983 Indianapolis 500, leading 61 laps. With less than 20 laps to go, Unser got challenges from Tom Sneva who led the most laps. With help from his son - who was several laps down - Unser began pulling away from Sneva. However Sneva got by Al Jr., and set sail for Unser Sr.. Sneva caught up to Unser within one lap of passing Al Jr., and passed him to retake the lead with nine laps to go. Sneva then easily pulled away to win the race by 11 seconds, avenging his firing from the team in 1978. After the race, Unser Jr. was penalized two laps for his actions as well as having passed two cars under caution on lap 170.

Unser won the IndyCar championships in 1983 and 1985 by winning one race and then having several top-five finishes. In 1986, Penske decided to focus the team's attention on teammate Rick Mears when he healed from serious injuries. As a result, Unser cut down his schedule to only a few IndyCar races a year, which he would do going forward.

NASCAR and IROC
Outside of his open-wheel career, Unser was a semi-regular competitor in IROC, winning three races and the 1977-1978 championship. His final IROC start was an 11th-place finish at the 1993 Michigan race after winning the pole.

Unser also started five races in NASCAR, three in the late 1960s and two in 1986. His best finishes were a pair of 4th-place results, one at the 1968 Daytona 500 and the other at the 1969 Motor Trend 500 at Riverside International Raceway. He fared less well in two 1986 starts, finishing 29th at Watkins Glen and 20th at Riverside.

Fourth Indianapolis 500 victory

In 1987, Penske's slate of drivers included Rick Mears, Danny Sullivan, and Danny Ongais. Al Unser Sr. was dropped from the team, and entered the month of May without a ride. During the first week of practice, Al Sr. spent much of the week shopping for a ride, and a few offers were made by owners. Al Sr., however, refused the offers, as he insisted on landing a ride in a competitive, well-funded car only. Unser planned on staying through the week, and if he did not have a ride by the end of the first week of time trials, he was planning to return home. Coincidentally, his son Al Unser Jr. (driving for Shierson Racing) was having difficulty with his car's handling. At the end of the first weekend of time trials, Al Jr. surprisingly had not yet qualified. Al Sr. agreed to stay through the week in order to help his son get his car up to speed. 

Danny Ongais crashed into the wall during the first week of practice, suffering a serious concussion, and was declared unfit to drive. Meanwhile, the Penske team's new Penske PC-16 chassis had been uncompetitive during practice. By the end of the first week of practice, Penske parked the PC-16s and elected to qualify back-up cars for the race. Mears and Sullivan were provided 1986 March-Ilmor Chevrolet machines, while a third car, a 1986 March-Cosworth, was planned for third driver.

Midway through the second week of practice, Roger Penske consummated a deal with Al Sr. to drive the third car. Penske promised Unser a well-funded effort, and a brand new Cosworth engine, the same chassis/engine combination that had won the previous four Indy 500s. The year-old March was removed from a Penske Racing display at a Sheraton hotel in the team's hometown of Reading, Pennsylvania, and hurriedly prepared for a return to active competition. Unser easily put the car in the field on the third day of time trials.

At the start Unser was in the 20th position. On a day when heavy attrition felled most of the field's front-runners, including the overwhelmingly dominant Newman-Haas entry of Mario Andretti, Unser worked his way steadily forward and took the lead on the 183rd lap, after Roberto Guerrero's car stalled on his final pit stop. Averaging , Unser bested a charging Guerrero by 4.5 seconds to win his fourth Indy 500, only five days before his 48th birthday. In doing so he tied Foyt as the winningest Indy 500 driver and broke brother Bobby's record as the oldest Indy winner.

Unser rode the wave of his fourth Indy victory to secure a ride at Penske for the Michigan 500, Pocono 500, and Marlboro Challenge for 1987. Near the end of the year, Unser had two other starts. He drove as a substitute for Roberto Guerrero at Nazareth, and had a competitive run until crashing a few laps short of the finish. He was then hired to drive the brand new Porsche Indy car at Laguna Seca. The team was still in its infancy, and the car dropped out. Unser left the team after only one race.

In 1988 and 1989, Unser returned to Penske to secure a ride at the three 500-miles races (Indianapolis, Michigan, Pocono).

Retirement

After reorganization at Team Penske in 1990, Unser was finally crowded out of his part-time ride. With competitive rides filling up, and his career winding down, he joined the sub-par Patrick Racing Alfa Romeo team for 1990. After dropping out at Indy, Unser crashed in practice at Michigan and broke his leg. He quit the team after the crash.

He spent most of the month of May 1991 shopping around for a competitive ride. The restrictions on the number of leases to the Chevy Ilmor engine kept him out of a ride during the first week of practice. A last-minute deal with the UNO/Granatelli team (where he would be Arie Luyendyk's teammate) fell through when there was not enough time to prepare the car. Instead of jumping into another car "just to make the show," Unser sat out the 1991 race and watched from the sidelines for the first time since 1969.

In 1992, Unser entered the month of May for the second year in a row without a ride. During the first week of practice, Nelson Piquet was involved in a serious crash, and was unable to drive. Unser was hired by Team Menard to fill the position vacated by Piquet. Unser drove to a 3rd-place finish, while his son Al Unser Jr. won the race. It was Team Menard's best Indy 500 finish, the best finish for the Buick Indy engine, and the first time the Buick engine had gone the entire . Later in the year, Unser was selected to drive as a substitute for the injured Rick Mears at Nazareth. It was Unser's first start for Penske since 1989, and his final start in a CART series event. He finished 12th, earning 1 championship point.

In 1993, driving for King Racing, he led 15 laps at the Indianapolis 500 to extend his career laps-led record. He finished 12th, one lap down.

A month shy of his 55th birthday, Unser entered the 1994 race with Arizona Motorsports, hoping to qualify for what would be his 28th Indy 500. The team was very underfunded, and Unser had considerable trouble getting the car up to speed. On the first weekend of qualifying, he waved off after a poor qualifying lap. After some minimal practice the following day, he quit the team. He announced his retirement on May 17, 1994. His son Al Unser Jr. won the Indianapolis 500 on his father's 55th birthday.

Health and death
Unser suffered from hereditary haemochromatosis, which contributed to him being diagnosed with liver cancer in 2004 and having a tumor and half of his liver removed in 2005. Unser continued to suffer from cancer for the next 17 years before dying from the disease aged 82 on December 9, 2021, in his home in Chama, New Mexico.

Career highlights
Unser has led the second most laps of any driver in the history of the Indianapolis 500, at 644. Unser tied Ralph DePalma's long standing record of 612 laps led on the last lap of his 4th victory.

Unser holds the record of being the oldest driver to ever win the 500 at 47 years old (1987), breaking the previous record set by his brother Bobby.

Unser won two 500-mile races at Pocono (in 1976 and 1978) and two more at Ontario (in 1977 and 1978) bringing his total of 500-mile race wins (including four Indianapolis 500s) to eight.

Unser was the 1978 IROC champion. He also competed in the 1968 Daytona 500 and four other NASCAR Winston Cup & Grand National races, all held on road courses with a best finish of fourth (twice).

Awards
In 1986, Unser was inducted into the Indianapolis Motor Speedway Hall of Fame.
In 1998, he was inducted into the International Motorsports Hall of Fame.
He was inducted in the Motorsports Hall of Fame of America in 1991.

Motorsports career results

American open-wheel racing
(key) (Races in bold indicate pole position)

USAC Championship Car

PPG Indy Car World Series

Indianapolis 500

Non-Championship Formula One Results
(key)

NASCAR
(key) (Bold – Pole position awarded by qualifying time. Italics – Pole position earned by points standings or practice time. * – Most laps led.)

Grand National Series

Winston Cup Series

Daytona 500

International Race of Champions
(key) (Bold – Pole position. * – Most laps led.)

24 hours of Daytona

References

External links
 
 The Greatest 33
 Unser Racing Museum

1939 births
2021 deaths
24 Hours of Daytona drivers
American people of Swiss-German descent
Champ Car champions
Champ Car drivers
Indianapolis 500 drivers
Indianapolis 500 polesitters
Indianapolis 500 winners
International Motorsports Hall of Fame inductees
International Race of Champions drivers
NASCAR drivers
Racing drivers from Albuquerque, New Mexico
Trans-Am Series drivers
Unser family
Team Penske drivers
deaths from liver cancer
deaths from cancer in New Mexico
USAC Silver Crown Series drivers
USAC Stock Car drivers
A. J. Foyt Enterprises drivers
USAC Gold Crown champions